Lahrud (also Romanized as Lāhrūd; formerly, Lari, also Romanized as Lārī; formerly also, Serahi, also Romanized as Serāhī and Seh Rāhī) is a city in Meshgin-e Sharqi District of Meshgin Shahr County, Ardabil province, Iran. At the 2006 census, its population was 2,961 in 782 households. The following census in 2011 counted 2,583 people in 743 households. The latest census in 2016 showed a population of 2,149 people in 762 households.

References 

Meshgin Shahr County

Cities in Ardabil Province

Towns and villages in Meshgin Shahr County

Populated places in Ardabil Province

Populated places in Meshgin Shahr County